Jim Gilbert Pepper II (June 18, 1941 – February 10, 1992) was a jazz saxophonist, composer and singer of Kaw and Muscogee Creek Native American heritage. He moved to New York City in 1964, where he came to prominence in the late 1960s as a member of The Free Spirits, an early jazz-rock fusion group that also featured Larry Coryell and Bob Moses. Pepper went on to have a lengthy career in jazz, recording almost a dozen albums as a bandleader and many more as featured soloist. Pepper and Joe Lovano played tenor sax alongside each other in a band led by drummer Paul Motian, recording three LPs in 1984, 1985 and 1987. Motian described Pepper's playing as "post-Coltrane". Don Cherry (Choctaw/African American) was among those who encouraged Pepper to bring more of his Native culture into his music, and the two collaborated extensively. Pepper died of lymphoma aged 50.

Early life
Jim Pepper was born on June 18, 1941, to Gilbert and Floy Pepper in Salem, Oregon. He grew up in Portland. He attended Parkrose High School and Madison High School.

Music career
Beginning in the late 1960s, Pepper became a pioneer of fusion jazz. His band, The Free Spirits (active between 1965 and 1968, with guitarist Larry Coryell), is credited as the first to combine elements of jazz and rock. His primary instrument was the tenor saxophone (he also played flute and soprano saxophone).

Of Kaw and Creek heritage, Pepper also achieved notoriety for his compositions combining elements of jazz and Native American music. Don Cherry and Ornette Coleman encouraged Pepper to reflect his roots and heritage and incorporate it into his jazz playing and composition. He was a musical director for Night of the First Americans, a Native American self-awareness benefit concert at the John F. Kennedy Center for the Performing Arts in Washington, D.C. in 1980 and played also at numerous powwows. Pepper supported the American Indian Movement.

Pepper was a member of the short-lived band Everything Is Everything with Chris Hills, Lee Reinoehl, Chip Baker, John Waller and Jim Zitro.  Their 1969 self-titled sole album spawned the near-hit single "Witchi Tai To" (which received abundant airplay reaching number 69 on the Billboard Hot 100 chart, and on which Pepper was the lead singer).  It was issued on Vanguard Apostolic and UK Vanguard in England,
and is the only hit to feature an authentic Native American chant in the history of the Billboard pop charts.

His "Witchi Tai To" (derived from a peyote song of the Native American Church which he had learned from his grandfather) is the most famous example of his hybrid (jazz/Native American) style; the song has been covered by many other artists including Harper's Bizarre, Ralph Towner (with and without Oregon), Jan Garbarek, Pete Wyoming Bender, Brewer & Shipley, Larry Smith under the pseudonym of Topo D. Bill, and a version recorded by The Supremes in 1969 that went unreleased until 2022. It was also covered in 1973 by Quebec singer-songwriter Robert Charlebois.

In his own projects, Pepper recorded with Don Cherry, Naná Vasconcelos, Collin Walcott, Kenny Werner, John Scofield, Ed Schuller, Hamid Drake, and many others. His CD Comin' and Goin'  (1984) is the definitive statement of Pepper's unique "American Indian jazz" with nine songs played by four different line-ups. It was also the first CD issued by the then-new all-CD label Rykodisc. He also worked with the Liberation Music Orchestra, Paul Motian' s quintet, Bob Moses, Marty Cook, Mal Waldron, David Friesen, Tony Hymas and Amina Claudine Myers, and toured Europe extensively throughout his career.

While anecdotal mention of Pepper having played the saxophone solo on the Classics IV hit "Spooky" exists, this has been rather definitively credited to "Spooky" 's cowriter, Michael (Mike Sharpe) Shapiro, by Classics IV official biographer, Joe Glickman, and others.

Death and legacy
Jim Pepper died on February 10, 1992, of lymphoma.

In 1998, composer Gunther Schuller arranged, conducted and recorded Witchi Tai To: The Music of Jim Pepper for symphony orchestra and jazz band.

Pepper was posthumously granted the Lifetime Musical Achievement Award by First Americans in the Arts in 1999, and in 2000 he was inducted into the Native American Music Awards Hall of Fame. In 2005 the Oregon Legislative Assembly honored the extraordinary accomplishments and musical legacy of Pepper.

In April 2007, the National Museum of the American Indian in Washington, D.C. accepted Pepper's saxophone and hat at a ceremony honoring his music and legacy.

Discography
 Pepper's Pow Wow (Embryo, 1971)
 Comin' and Goin' (Europa, 1983)
 Dakota Song (Enja, 1987)
 Art of the Duo (Tutu, 1988) with Mal Waldron
 The Path (Enja, 1988)
 West End Avenue (Nagal, 1989) with Christoph Spendel, Ron McClure and Reuben Hoch
 Camargue (Pan, 1989) with the Claudine François Trio
 Flying Eagle: Live at New Morning, Paris (1989)
 Remembrance (Tutu, 1990)
 Polar Bear Stomp (Universal, 1991 [2003])
 Afro Indian Blues (PAO, 1991 2006) with Amina Claudine Myers, Anthony Cox and Leopoldo Fleming

With Everything Is Everything
 Everything Is Everything (Vanguard, 1969)

With The Free Spirits
 Out of Sight and Sound (ABC, 1967)
 Live at the Scene (Sunbeam, 2011)

As sideman
With Archie James Cavanaugh
 Black and White Raven (BWR, 1980)
With Marty Cook
 Nightwork (Enja, 1987)
 Red, White, Black & Blue (Enja, 1987)
With Larry Coryell
 Coryell (Vanguard, 1969)
With The Fugs
 The Belle of Avenue A (Reprise, 1969)
With Gordon Lee
 Land Whales in New York (Gleeful, 1982 [1990])
With Charlie Haden
 The Ballad of the Fallen (ECM, 1983)
With Sandy Hurvitz
 Sandy's Album Is Here At Last (Verve, 1967)
With Tony Hymas
 Oyaté (Nato, 1990)
With Paul Motian
 The Story of Maryam (Soul Note, 1984)
 Jack of Clubs (Soul Note, 1985)
 Misterioso (Soul Note, 1987)
With Bob Moses
 Love Animal (Amulet, 1968 [2003])
 When Elephants Dream of Music (Gramavision, 1983)
With Cam Newton
 Welcome Aliens (Inner City, 1979)
With Ray and the Wolf Gang
 The Blues Can't Turn You Loose (Gray Cats, 1987)
With Nana Simopoulos
 Wings and Air (Enja, 1986)
With Mal Waldron
 Remembering the Moment with Julian Priester, Eddie Moore & David Friesen (Soul Note, 1987)
 Quadrologue at Utopia (Tutu, 1989)
 More Git' Go at Utopia (Tutu, 1989)
With Peter Walker
 Second Poem to Karmela or Gypsies Are Important (Vanguard, 1968)
With the World Music Orchestra
 East West Suite (Granite, 1990)

Filmography
Pepper's Pow Wow (1995).  Directed by Sandra Sunrising Osawa.  Seattle, Washington:  Upstream Productions.

References

The Encyclopedia of Native Music [University of Arizona Press, 2005], Brian Wright-McLeod

External links
"Jazz and The Politics of Identity: The Legacy of Jim Pepper" (In Motion Magazine)
"Jim Pepper: The Man Who Never Sleeps" (In Motion Magazine)
Jack Berry, "Comin' and Goin': Memories of Jazzman Jim Pepper" Oregon Historical Quarterly Spring, 2006

Native American composers
Native American singers
20th-century American composers
20th-century American singers
20th-century American saxophonists
American jazz saxophonists
Jazz tenor saxophonists
Jazz soprano saxophonists
American male saxophonists
Jazz fusion musicians
Avant-garde jazz musicians
American male jazz musicians
20th-century American male musicians
The Free Spirits members
Musicians from Portland, Oregon
Parkrose High School alumni
Muscogee people
Kaw people
Deaths from cancer in Oregon
Deaths from lymphoma
1941 births
1992 deaths
20th-century Native Americans
Leodis V. McDaniel High School alumni